Pogostemon is a large genus from the family Lamiaceae, first described as a genus in 1815. It is native to warmer parts of Asia, Africa, and Australia.

The best known member of this genus is patchouli, Pogostemon cablin, widely cultivated in Asia for its scented foliage, used for perfume, incense, insect repellent, herbal tea, etc. In 1997, it was proposed for the genus to be split into three subgenera— Allopogostemon Bhatti & Ingr., Dysophyllus (Blume) Bhatti & Ingr., and Pogostemon sensu Bhatti & Ingr. based on numerous morphological characteristics. However, the significant variability in these traits as well as possible convergent evolution within this genus has made classification of species challenging. Some members of the genus (ie. Pogostemon erectus,Pogostemon stellatus, Pogostemon helferi) are grown ornamentally in the aquarium hobby and are used for aquascaping.

Selected species
Species include:
Pogostemon amaranthoides Benth.
Pogostemon andersonii (Prain) Panigrahi
Pogostemon aquaticus (C.H.Wright) Press
Pogostemon atropurpureus Benth.
Pogostemon auricularius  (L.) Hassk. - southeast Asia
Pogostemon barbatus Bhoti & Ingr.
Pogostemon benghalensis (Burm.f.) Kuntze
Pogostemon brachystachyus Benth.
Pogostemon brevicorollus Y.Z.Sun
Pogostemon cablin (Blanco) Benth. - South Asia & southeast Asia
Pogostemon championii Prain
Pogostemon chinensis C.Y.Wu & Y.C.Huang
Pogostemon crassicaulis (Benth.) Press
Pogostemon cristatus Hassk.
Pogostemon cruciatus (Benth.) Kuntze
Pogostemon dasianus A.B.De & Mukerjee
Pogostemon deccanensis (Panigrahi) Press
Pogostemon dielsianus Dunn
Pogostemon elatispicatus Bhoti & Ingr.
Pogostemon elsholtzioides Benth.
Pogostemon erectus (Dalzell) Kuntze
Pogostemon esquirolii (H.Lév.) C.Y.Wu & Y.C.Huang
Pogostemon falcatus (C.Y.Wu) C.Y.Wu & H.W.Li
Pogostemon formosanus Oliv. - Taiwan
Pogostemon fraternus Miq.
Pogostemon gardneri Hook.f.
Pogostemon glaber Benth.
Pogostemon glabratus Chermsir. ex Press
Pogostemon globulosus Phuong ex Suddee & A.J.Paton
Pogostemon griffithii Prain
Pogostemon hedgei V.S.Kumar & B.D.Sharma
Pogostemon helferi (Hook.f.) Press
Pogostemon heyneanus Benth. - South Asia & southeast Asia
Pogostemon hirsutus Benth.
Pogostemon hispidocalyx C.Y.Wu & Y.C.Huang
Pogostemon hispidus (Benth.) Prain
Pogostemon kachinensis (Mukerjee) Panigrahi
Pogostemon koehneanus (Muschl.) Press
Pogostemon linearis (Benth.) Kuntze
Pogostemon litigiosus Doan ex Suddee & A.J.Paton
Pogostemon lythroides (Diels) Press
Pogostemon macgregorii W.W.Sm.
Pogostemon manipurensis V.S.Kumar
Pogostemon membranaceus Merr.
Pogostemon menthoides Blume
Pogostemon micangensis G.Taylor
Pogostemon mollis Benth.
Pogostemon mutamba (Hiern) G.Taylor
Pogostemon myosuroides (Roth) Kuntze
Pogostemon nelsonii Doan ex Suddee & A.J.Paton
Pogostemon nepetoides Stapf
Pogostemon nigrescens Dunn
Pogostemon nilagiricus Gamble
Pogostemon paludosus Benth. - southern India 
Pogostemon paniculatus (Willd.) Benth.
Pogostemon parviflorus Benth.
Pogostemon peethapushpum Pradeep
Pogostemon peguanus (Prain) Press
Pogostemon pentagonus (C.B.Clarke ex Hook.f.) Kuntze
Pogostemon petiolaris Benth.
Pogostemon philippinensis S.Moore
Pogostemon plectrantoides Desf.
Pogostemon pressii Panigrahi
Pogostemon pubescens Benth.
Pogostemon pumilus (Graham) Press
Pogostemon purpurascens Dalzell
Pogostemon quadrifolius (Benth.) F.Muell.
Pogostemon raghavendranii R.Murugan & Livingst.
Pogostemon rajendranii Ramasamy
Pogostemon reflexus Benth.
Pogostemon reticulatus Merr.
Pogostemon rogersii N.E.Br.
Pogostemon rotundatus Benth.
Pogostemon rugosus (Hook.f.) El Gazzar & L.Watson
Pogostemon rupestris Benth.
Pogostemon salicifolius (Dalzell ex Hook.f.) El Gazzar & L.Watson
Pogostemon sampsonii (Hance) Press
Pogostemon septentrionalis C.Y.Wu & Y.C.Huang
Pogostemon speciosus Benth.
Pogostemon stellatus (Lour.) Kuntze - southeast Asia, southern China, northern Australia
Pogostemon stocksii (Hook.f.) Press
Pogostemon strigosus (Benth.) Benth.
Pogostemon szemaoensis (C.Y.Wu & S.J.Hsuan) Press
Pogostemon tisserantii (Pellegr.) Bhoti & Ingr.
Pogostemon travancoricus Bedd.
Pogostemon trinervis Chermsir. ex Press
Pogostemon tuberculosus Benth.
Pogostemon velatus Benth.
Pogostemon vestitus Benth.
Pogostemon villosus (Roxb.) Benth.
Pogostemon wattii C.B.Clarke
Pogostemon wightii Benth.
Pogostemon williamsii Elmer
Pogostemon xanthiifolius C.Y.Wu & Y.C.Huang
Pogostemon yatabeanus (Makino) Press

References

 
Lamiaceae genera
Taxa named by René Louiche Desfontaines